Wutong is a subdistrict and the seat of Lengshuitan District in Yongzhou Prefecture-level City, Hunan, China. In 2015,  the subdistrict was divided into 3 communities, its seat is at Wutong Community.

References

External links
Official website of Wutong Subdistrict (Chinese / 中文)

Lengshuitan
Subdistricts of Hunan
County seats in Hunan